was a World War II Japanese fighter ace. In early 1942, at the age of 22, he flew a Mitsubishi A6M Zero with the Lae-based Tainan Air Group. There the young petty officer, 1st class became one of the so-called "Clean-up Trio" of Japanese aces, along with his squadron mates Saburo Sakai and Hiroyoshi Nishizawa.  

Ōta's first confirmed kill, of a U.S. Army Air Force P-40E Warhawk, was over New Guinea on April 11, 1942.  Transferred to Rabaul in August, Ōta was killed in a dogfight with U.S. Marine Corps Grumman F4F Wildcats over Guadalcanal on October 21, shortly after shooting down a Wildcat himself. His victorious opponent is believed to be 1st Lt. Frank C. Drury of VMF-212. Ōta is credited with 34 victories, making him the Imperial Japanese Navy's fourth-ranking ace.

In his autobiography, Sakai described Ōta as outgoing and amiable, in contrast to the more reserved Nishizawa, and said he would have been "more at home in a nightclub" than in Lae.

References
"Winged Samurai - Saburo Sakai and the Zero Fighter Pilots" by Henry Sakaida, Champlin Fighter Museum, 1985, 

1919 births
1942 deaths
Japanese military personnel of World War II
Japanese naval aviators
Japanese World War II flying aces
Japanese military personnel killed in World War II